Baladeva can refer to:

 Balabhadra, among the sixty-three illustrious beings in Jainism
 Balarama, Hindu deity and the elder brother of Krishna